Hoxie USD 412 is a public unified school district headquartered in Hoxie, Kansas, United States.  The district includes the communities of Hoxie, Jennings (south of highway 383), Leoville, Seguin, Studley, Tasco, Allison, Dresden (south of highway 383), rural areas southwest of the Clayton (south of highway 383), and other nearby rural areas.

Schools
The school district operates the following schools:
 Hoxie Junior-Senior High School
 Hoxie Elmentary School

History
In 2006, Prairie Heights USD 295 underwent a dissolution. Hoxie USD 412 took a majority of the students, the rest are going to Oberlin USD 294.

See also
 Kansas State Department of Education
 Kansas State High School Activities Association
 List of high schools in Kansas
 List of unified school districts in Kansas

References

External links
 

School districts in Kansas
Sheridan County, Kansas